ME3 may refer to:

 ME3 (gene)
 Maine's 3rd congressional district
 Maine State Route 3
 Mass Effect 3
 ME3 carriers